Chetna Natya Manch (CNM; English: Awakening and Dramatic Arts Front) is the "Cultural Troupe" of the Communist Party of India (Maoist). Chetna Natya Manch is headed by Leng (who is from Andhra Pradesh), and has more than 10,000 members.

Background and activities

The CNM is the "propaganda unit" and "cultural wing" of the Communist Party of India (Marxist–Leninist) People's War (PWG), and "conducted dance, drama, poetry and musical workshops" in the villages, "inspiring young people to join the PWG." According to them, they are a "cultural team", and they "don't fight" but only "sing". They also focus on literature and plastic arts. They have raised their music cassettes by themselves and also have a "mobile editing unit."

The CNM attracts "huge crowds" to their presentations.

Publication
The CNM, in August 1994, began publishing a bimonthly magazine named "Jhankar" in Bengali, Gondi, Hindi, Marathi and Telugu. It is still published.

Opposition
The government of India's ministry of Information and Broadcasting has "activated its own cultural wing" to "counter" the CNM, which they believe is "instigating the tribals against the Indian state through songs and cultural programmes."

The CNM was banned by the government of Chhattisgarh on 16 August 2013 under the Chhattisgarh Special Public Security Act for its alleged participation in the "insurgency activities" in the Red corridor region of Chhattisgarh, and recently, the ban has been extended till 30 August 2015.

References

See also
 Krantikari Adivasi Mahila Sangathan
 Nari Mukti Sangh
Communist Party of India (Maoist)
Maoist organisations in India
Volunteer organisations in India
Organisations designated as terrorist by India